Construction Simulator 2015 (Bau-Simulator in the original German title) is a PC game released in 2015 by German company Astragon, which specializes in simulation software.

Gameplay
Gameplay begins with tutorials where the player learn to drive the basic heavy machinery of the game, including trucks and excavators. As the game goes on, the player can select different contracts, to build several types of buildings, and manage his contractor company. The player can purchase new vehicles and equipment (from different brands including Caterpillar, Liebherr, John Deere and many more), and even hire new workers. The game features open world, and the player unlock the locations as he discovers them. Fast-travel is available in certain moments of the game and between missions.

Sequels

Construction Simulator 2 was released in 2017 and new features include male and female playable characters, new contracts and buildings in Desert Springs, Sunny Hills, Westgate and Northridge.

Construction Simulator 3 was released in 2019 and features contracts in Europe.

External links

References 

2015 video games
Simulation video games
Video games developed in Germany
Windows games
Windows-only games